Regina Maria Póvoa Pessoa Martins (born 16 December 1969) is a Portuguese animator.

Biography 
Regina Pessoa was born in Coimbra, but lived in a village near the city until she was seventeen. Without a TV, she spent her time reading, listening to the older ones telling stories and also painting her grandmother's house doors and walls using charcoal, encouraged by her uncle.

She graduated in painting from University of Porto in 1998 and during her time as a student took part in different animation workshops, having participated in Espace Projets (Annecy, 1995) with the short A Noite, which she would finish in 1999.

In 1992 she started working in Filmógrafo - Estúdio de Cinema de Animação do Porto, where she collaborated as animator in various films.

Her short Tragic Story with Happy Ending is the most awarded Portuguese film ever.

Her short animated film, "Kali, the Little Vampire" was awarded the Hiroshima prize at the 2012 Hiroshima international animation festival, the "1st Prize Animated Short Film – CHICAGO INTERNATIONAL CHILDREN’S FILM FESTIVAL 2013", "The Golden Gate Award for Best Animation Short - 56th SAN FRANCISCO INT. FILM FESTIVAL 2013", "40TH Annie Awards Nomination in the Best Animated Short Subject Category 2013", Nomination for the Cartoon d’Or 2013.

Filmography 
 Ciclo Vicioso, 23sec., Betacam (campaign against smoking for GlaxoWellcome) - co-directed with Abi Feijó and Pedro Serrazina (1996)
 Estrelas de Natal, 40sec., Betacam (for RTP) - co-directed with Abi Feijó (1998)
 A Noite, 6min 35sec., 35mm (1999)
 Odisseia nas Imagens, 25sec., 35mm (Festival Intro) (2001)
 Tragic Story with Happy Ending, 7min 46sec. (2005)
 Kali the Little Vampire, 9min 30sec. (2012)
 Uncle Thomas: Accounting for the Days (2019)

References

External links
  Ciclope Filmes
 Watch films by Regina Pessoa at the National Film Board of Canada

1969 births
Living people
People from Coimbra
Portuguese animators
Women animators
University of Porto alumni
20th-century Portuguese women artists
20th-century Portuguese artists
21st-century Portuguese women artists